Quảng Ninh or Quangninh is a province along the northeastern coast of Vietnam. It is about 153 km (95 mi) east of Hanoi, comprising four cities, two district-level towns and seven rural districts. The provincial capital is Hạ Long. The province covers an area of 6178.21 square kilometres and, as of 2019, had a population of 1,320,324. Nearly 80% of the province is mountainous with abundant land, forest, water and mineral resources, with 90% of Vietnam's coal output extracted from the province. The province is also home to Hạ Long Bay, a World Heritage Site that has 1,969 islands, out of which 989 have been given names.

Quảng Ninh has a Human Development Index of 0.769 (high), ranking sixth among all municipalities and provinces of Vietnam.

Etymology
The name of Quảng Ninh province is the compound name of two former provinces: Quảng Yên and Hải Ninh according to the naming of President Ho Chi Minh.

Geography
The province has the shape of an oblique rectangle inclined in a northeast-to-southwest direction. To the west, the province borders an extended forest and mountain region. To the east, it is adjacent to the Gulf of Bắc Bộ. It features a meandering coastline, estuaries and tidal flats and more than 2,000 large and small islands. Exactly 1,030 of these have been named. Quảng Ninh's coordinates are longitude 106º25′ to 108º25′ east and latitude 20º40′ to 21º40′ north. Its width from east to west is 195 km (at the widest part).

The length from north to south of the province is 102 km. The northernmost point is in a mountain range at Mo Toòng village (Hoành Mô Commune, Bình Liêu District). The southernmost point is in Hạ Mai Island (Ngọc Vừng Commune, Vân Đồn District). The westernmost point is in Vàng Chua River (Bình Dương and Nguyễn Huệ communes, Đông Triều District). The easternmost point is inland at Got Cape, northeast of Trà Cổ Commune, Móng Cái Town.

Quảng Ninh has a common international border with the People's Republic of China. Inland, north of province (Bình Liêu, Hải Hà districts) and Móng Cái borders Dongxing City and Fangcheng County in Guangxi, PRC with the borderline of 170 km. To the east, it adjuncts to Bắc Bộ Gulf. The province also borders Lạng Sơn, Bắc Giang and Hải Dương provinces to the west, and the city of Hải Phòng to the south. The coastal line is 250 km. The total area of Quảng Ninh is 8,239.243 km2, of which 5,938 km2 is mainland. The area of islands, bays and sea is a tremendous 2,448.853 km2. The total area of the islands is 619.913 km2.

Topography
Quảng Ninh is a mountainous and coastal province, with more than 80 per cent of its area being made up of mountains and hills. The 2,000 some islands are also considered mountains. The mountainous zone can be divided into two parts: the eastern mountainous region extending from Tiên Yên through Bình Liêu, Hải Hà, Đầm Hà and Móng Cái; and the western zone ranging from Tiên Yên through Ba Chẽ and Hoành Bồ, north of Uông Bí Town. The former is a continuation of the Thâp Van Đai Son range in China. There are two main chains: Quảng Nam Châu 1,507 m and Cao Xiêm 1,330 m. The western zone features smooth and curved mountains called Đông Triều with Yên Tu Mount 1,068 m in Uông Bí region and Am Váp Mount 1,094 m in Hoành Bồ District.

The midland and coastal plains include a low range of hills weathered by both wind and water; forming fields and river basins. They include the zones of Đông Triêu, Uông Bí, northern Yên Hưng, southern Tiên Yên, Hải Hà and some of Móng Cái. In the estuaries, alluvial soil is deposited, creating low tidal flats. This can be found in the areas of southern Uông Bí, southern Yên Hưng (Hà Nam Island), eastern Yên Hưng, Đông Rui (Tiên Yên), southern Đầm Hà and Mong Cai, southeastern Hải Hà. The midlands and plains of the coastline are extremely favourable for agriculture and transport. It has become a densely populated area.

The sea and island zone of Quảng Ninh has a unique terrain. There are more than 2,000 islands, making up two-thirds of the country's islands. They extend along the coast for more than 250 km and divide into numerous layers. The largest islands are Cái Bầu and Bản Sen, while the smallest are just like rocks in a garden. Vân Đồn and Cô Tô are island districts. There are thousands of islands on Hạ Long Bay and Bái Tử Long Bay, many of which contain caves. Besides areas of alluvial deposits, there are also white sand zones which have built up from tidal action. Some places have formed white sand mines producing materials for the glass industry (Van Hai), or have developed into tourism spots (Trà Cổ, Quan Lạn, Minh Châu, Ngọc Vừng).

The sea bottom terrain of Quảng Ninh isn't smooth, and has an average depth of 20 m. There are the remnants of ancient streams and underwater rocky banks. The streams from the mainland connect to deep drains along the sea-floor; creating a series of waterways, canals and harbours along the coast.

Hydrography
In Quảng Ninh, there are numerous rivers and springs, but most are short and small, and feature currents that differ between seasons. In winter, most rivers run dry; in summer, waterfalls pick up fast currents. The water current reaches 1.45 m3/s in dry season, but up to 1,500 m3/s in the rainy season. Quảng Ninh's sea borders upon the Gulf of Bắc Bộ. It is large and protected by the ranks of islands, so the wind is quieter and the water smoother. The gulf's current runs from north to south. It is Vietnam's coldest sea, with the temperature sometimes dipping below 13 °C. The average tide level recorded is 2.5 m.

Water resources

Water resources in the province of Quảng Ninh are abundant and distinct. The largest rivers are: the Ka Long (the natural national border between China and Vietnam), Hà Côi, Đầm Hà, Tiên Yên, Phố Cũ, Ba Chẽ, Diễn Vọng, Trới, Míp, Uông, Đạm and Cầm rivers. The provincial border is the Kinh Thầy River which joins the Đá Bạch River and runs into Bạch Đằng. The total static capacity is estimated at 175.106 m3 of water. Out of the 72 lakes and dams, there are 28 large lakes with a total of capacity of 195.53 million m3 of water. The largest is Yên Lập Lake, which blocks the Míp Estuary. Its water volume is 1.18 million m3. Other lakes include: Khuất Động, Trúc Bài Sơn, Khe Táu, Đoan Tĩnh, Khe Uơn, Khe Chếnh, Yên Trung, Bến Châu, Trại Lốc, Rộc Cả and An Biên.

Underground running water is also abundant, and can even be found on some of the larger islands. According to prospective data, 13 urban and industrial areas make use of 64,388 m3 water/day. In the province there are natural bottle water points in Quảng Hanh (Cẩm Phả), Khe Lạc (Tiên Yên) and Đồng Long (Bình Liêu). Mineral water is concentrated in the village of Quảng Hanh. Presently, there are 15 exploration holes, and according to preliminary results, capacity could be 1,004 m3/day. Quảng Hanh mineral water is clear and colourless, with mineral content varying from 3.5 to 5.05 g/L.

Mineral resources
The province has rich natural mineral resources of coal, limestone, clay, kaolin, white sand, granite and so forth. Large reserves of anthracite coal account for 90 per cent of coal output of Vietnam. Limestone reserves are estimated at 3.1 billion tonnes which would be the basic input for cement manufacture. Other mineral resources phosphoric, titan, antimony, quartz and oil have been found which could auger more industrial projects in the Province. Clay and glassy sand, important material inputs in the building industry for manufacture of tiles, bricks fired-bricks, bricks, ceramics, are in abundance.

Climate

Quảng Ninh's climate is symbolic of the climate of North Vietnam; featuring all four seasons. In summer, it is hot, humid and rainy, while monsoons flourish. The average annual temperature recorded is 22.9 °C. In winter, it is cold (between 1 and 3 °C), dry, and sees little rainfall (between 150 mm and 400 mm). The average humidity is 82 percent. Annual average rainfall, influenced by north-eastern monsoons, varies between 1,700 mm and 2,400 mm (maximum recorded is 2751 mm), with rainfall concentrated in the summer months for 90 to 170 days, particularly in July and August.

In comparison to other provinces in the north, Quảng Ninh has been more under the influences of north-eastern monsoon. The wind blows strongly and the temperature drops to between 1 and. During the north-east monsoon, high mountainous regions such as Bình Liêu and Hải Hà, Đầm Hà experiences temperatures below 0 °C. Storms have a large influence on the province, mainly in June, July and August. The intensity can be extremely strong, especially in island and coastal regions.

Because of the terrain differences, the climates of sub-regions differ. The border area of the Móng Cái District is colder and rainy, with an average temperature of around 22 °C and rainfall reaching 2,751 mm. In the Yên Hưng District, the most southern area, the average temperature is 24 °C and gets an average rainfall of 1,700 mm. The high mountainous region of Hoành Bồ, and Ba Chẽ districts, has 20 days of frost a year, and is subject to little rainfall. In the Bình Liêu District there is heavy rain (2,400 mm) and winter lasts for six months. The offshore island region is not the wettest area, with only 1,700 to 1,800 mm of rainfall per year, but winter is often accompanied by thick mists.

History

Prehistoric
Quảng Ninh is a land of rich history. In Hạ Long Bay area has archaeological remains of prehistoric people from 3000 to 1500 BC. This period is characterized as Hạ Long culture with many archaeological shells used as jewelry and money exchange, ancient animal bones, and human bones.

This land of Quảng Ninh is one of the 15 tribes of Văn Lang State.

Feudal
Quảng Ninh area has had several names:
 Ngô dynasty called Lục Châu
 Lý dynasty called Đông Hải
 Trần dynasty called Hải Đông
 Later Lê dynasty called An Bang
 Nguyễn dynasty called Quảng Yên
The historic sites of Quảng Ninh Province:
 Bạch Đằng River. Today the territory of Quảng Yên town, the region adjacent to the city of Hai Phong.
 Commercial Vân Đồn port. With the naval war against the Mongol Empire. This sector Quan Lang and Minh Chau, Vân Đồn District
 Tomb of Trần dynasty. The capital is home to the Trần dynasty ancestors before migrating down the Thái Bình, Thien Truong. Today the territory of Đông Triều District
 Yên Tu Mount. The land of Trúc Lâm Zen. Today the territory of Uông Bí city.

French colonial period to the present
After the invasion of occupied Tonkin, in 1899 the French part Quảng Yên established Hải Ninh province. Seeing coal mineral resources. French colonialists increase in mining zones Hong Gai, Mao Khe, Vang Danh, Cam Pha Town, Ha Tu, etc. Established the Northern Coal Company of France (SFCT) exclusive exploitation and consumption of coal, power scavenged resources and exploitation of colonies. Along with the coal industry, Quảng Ninh is one of the Vietnamese working class formed the earliest.

The general strike of more than 30,000 miners 12 November 1936 demanding higher wages reduce the hours of glorious victory has become one of the most iconic historical events of the Vietnamese revolutionary movement during play for civil rights democracy and national independence. Later became the traditional date of the mines: Date indomitable mines.
 
After the August Revolution in 1945, Vietnam's independence, the government at the hands of the people. 1963 platform is the Hong Quang and provinces Hải Ninh Government Democratic Republic of Vietnam established the province Quảng Ninh. According to the setting of Ho Chi Minh, the name of the province is the name of two transplant Quảng Yên and Hải Ninh old. During the Sino-Vietnamese War, the province was the site of the Battle of Móng Cái and the Battle of Cao Ba Lanh. The area of the province of Quảng Ninh is 8,239.243 km ².

Administrative divisions
Quảng Ninh is divided into 13 district-level sub-divisions and 177 commune-level sub-divisions:

Demographics

The male population during this period was 671,522 while the female population was 648,802. The rural population was 498,338 (36.1% of total population) against an urban population of 822,761 (63.9% of total population).

There are about 40 ethnic groups in Quảng Ninh recognized by the Vietnamese government. Each ethnicity has their own language, traditions, and subculture. The largest ethnic groups are: Vietnamese 87.69%, Dao 5.57%, Tày 3.08%, and Sán Dìu 1.56%, with all others composing the remaining 2.1% (2019 census).

In this land of ancient culture the dominant religious beliefs are of Buddhists, Christians and ancestor worship in addition to other folk beliefs.

Cities, towns

Fauna and flora
Quảng Ninh features a diversified and abundant environmental system, thanks to its varied terrain, climate and soil. The province thus has a rich biodiversity of flora and fauna. Identified floral species are numbered at 1,027 of 6 phyla, while faunal species are 120.

Fauna
There are the regular domestic animals: cattle, pigs, poultry, cats, dogs, and rabbits. Cattle breeding has developed well in the mountainous regions, while the Móng Cái pig is now famous for its especially lean meat. In eastern districts, swans hybridized with ducks, called cà sáy by locals, are also becoming popular. Numerous foreign cattle are imported as well: buffaloes from India, milk cows from the Netherlands and India and horses, sheep and goats from Mongolia.

Wild animals
Formerly, as with the rest of Vietnam, there were once numerous wild animals. In more remote times, there were elephants, rhinoceros, tigers, leopards and bears roaming the area. Today, there are monkeys, deer, pheasants, eagles, wild boars, various birds and tortoises (which unfortunately are less abundant than they once were).

Aquatic fauna
In Quảng Ninh aquatic fauna is very abundant, both fresh and sea water. There are large species of fish in the Gulf of Bắc Bộ. In addition, there are special species such as pearl mussels, stockfish, sea turtles and lobsters, while along the coastline, oysters and edible seaweed abound. These numerous fish resources of the sea have always been an important source of income for the residents of Quảng Ninh.

Flora
Quảng Ninh's floral strong point has always been forestry. Agricultural land is narrow and unfertilized, so the production of rice, maize and sweet potatoes is poor. Making up for this is high productivity from fruit trees, lumber trees and industrial plants.

The area for fruit trees in the Đông Triều District totals around 30 km2. Formerly in Quảng Ninh, there was diverse and high-quality wood available, in particular ironwood and teak trees. Presently, there are mainly pine trees. In mountainous areas, there are some very diverse trees and plants, providing spices and traditional medicines.

Economy

Although economy of the region is agriculture based, other sectors of industries and tourism are also getting priority attention.

Being in the northern economic triangle (Hà Nội – Hải Phòng – Quảng Ninh), the province has abundant resources and has immense potential to develop the economy in every sector. The People's Committee of Quảng Ninh province in 2007 approved proposals for development plans up to 2020. Industrial development is taking place at a rapid pace. Mineral extraction industries are being developed. Special economic zones are being created and the plans envisage making the province a modern industrial province by 2015. The two economic development zones under development are the Mong Cai Border Gate Economic Zone and the Van Don Economic Zone. Tourism is also a sector of economic development, which has been given priority. Quảng Ninh has targeted to become a regional high-quality tourism center and an economic growth hub in the North with synchronized socio-economic and technical infrastructure and improved living conditions.

Some of the economic indicators in agriculture, industries and other sectors are the following.
There are only 1,440 farms as against the national number of 120,699

The output value of agriculture produce at constant 1994 prices in the province was 952.5 billion đồngs against the national value of 156,681.9 billion đồngs.

The province produced 227,700 tonnes of cereals as against the national production of 43.68 million tonnes

The per capita production of cereals in the district was 205.2 kg as against the national figure of 501.8 kg. in 2008.

In 2007, the industrial output of the province was 37,987.5 billion VND against the national output of 1.47 million billion VND.

Historical places

The province has number of attractions connected with the landforms such as the mountains and the sea or the bay, religious places of worship and festivals. Some of these are:

Mountains
Bài Thơ Mountain is a limestone mountain formation, which rises to a height of 106 meters, right in the middle of Hạ Long City. It appears like a giant castle with three towers of the undulating rock. Another famous mountain is the That Bai Tho Mountain, which was earlier called the Transmission Mount (Then). It has historical linkage to the visit of Emperor Lê Thánh Tông to the provincial city in 1468. The emperor was moved by the beauty of the mountain covered with clouds, called it a young fairy of Hạ Long and got a poem written on it and engraved on the southern side of the rocky cliff. In 1729, Lord Trịnh Cương did a painting and poem on Emperor Lê Thánh Tông on this mountain. That's why it was called Bai Tho mountain (Poem mountain).
Bai Tho mountain is an important historical and cultural relic as well as a tourist attraction.

Temples

Two popular temples in the province are the Cua Ong Temple is located on a mountain overlooking low Bai Tu Long Bay, and the Tien Temple located next to the headquarters of People's Committee of Cam La commune.

Bạch Đằng beach
Bạch Đằng beach is a historical site which commemorates the 13th-century victory of Trần Quốc Tuấn over the Mongols, who had invaded the country with 30,000 troops.

Transportation system

The road network in the province consists of the National Highways No. 10, 18, and 48. Highway No. 10 links to Hanoi, Haiphong and other northern provinces. National Highway 4B connects the province with Lạng Sơn and Cao Bằng.

The Van Don International Airport serves the province. Hanoi's Noi Bai International Airport is linked to the Mong Cai International Border Gate over a road distance of 288 km.

The Hanoi–Hạ Long (Cai Lan port) railway line has been improved. Rail links of 64 km length connect to industries in the province.

The water transport is provided by its many rivers and the sea ports such as the Cai Lan port (largest deep water port in North Vietnam is under further expansion to handle cargo of 7–10 million tonnes per year. Another port is the Cu Ong port, which can handle ships of 65,000–70,000 DWT capacity. Other minor ports in the coastline of the province are the Bo, Cau Trang, B12, Mui Chua, Dien Cong, Bach Thai Buoi, Tien Yen and Dan Tien.

The Bính Bridge crosses the Cấm River and ultimately connects the province with the city of Hai Phong.

See also
Economy of Vietnam
Energy in Vietnam
South China Sea
World Heritage Site

References

External links
 
  

 
Northeast (Vietnam)
Gulf of Tonkin
Provinces of Vietnam